Rohilla was a passenger steamer of the British India Steam Navigation Company which was built for service between the UK and India, and as a troopship. After becoming a hospital ship in the First World War, She ran aground in October 1914, near Whitby, with the loss of 83 lives.

History
Rohilla was ordered in 1905 by the British India Steam Navigation Company (BI) from Harland & Wolff Ltd of Belfast, at the same time as sister ship  from William Denny & Bros at Dumbarton. They differed mainly in their engines: Rewa was triple-screw with steam turbines, while Rohilla had a pair of quadruple expansion steam engines, also made by Harland & Wolff, and twin screws. Rohillas engines totalled , producing  on sea trials. Although ordered for the London to Calcutta service, increased competition prompted BI to design the two sisters to be suitable also as troopships.

The steamship was named Rohilla in honour of the Rohillas, Pashtun highlanders who lived in Rohilkhand, east of Delhi, in the modern Indian state of Uttar Pradesh.

After entering service, the sisters were soon taken up for trooping, in 1908 for Rohilla as 'Troopship No.6'. Two years later they were the first BI ships to have radio receivers fitted, and were both hired in that year for the Coronation Fleet Review, carrying members of the House of Lords (Rewa) and House of Commons (Rohilla).

Loss

Rohilla was called up at the outset of the First World War and converted into a naval hospital ship. HMHS (His Majesty's Hospital Ship) Rohilla had only a short life in that role. On 30 October 1914, sailing from South Queensferry, Firth of Forth for Dunkirk to evacuate wounded soldiers, the ship ran aground on Saltwick Nab, a reef about a mile east of Whitby, North Riding of Yorkshire, during a full North North East gale and with the lighthouses unlit due to the war.

The conditions made rescue extremely difficult, but six lifeboats the John Fielden, Robert and Mary Ellis (Whitby), William Riley of Birmingham and Leamington (Upgang), the motor lifeboat Bradford Middlesbrough, Queensbury Scarborough, North Yorkshire, but it was the motor lifeboat Henry Vernon Tynemouth that was to take off the final souls and attempted to close on the wreck. Over the next three days, some of those who attempted to swim to safety in the raging seas were rescued, though many were lost, and lifeboats were able to rescue others. In all, 146 of the 229 on board, including Captain Neilson and all the nurses, as well as  survivor Mary Kezia Roberts, survived.

Captain Nielson believed that the ship had struck a mine before grounding. An inquest jury exonerated Nielson from all blame and recommended that all passenger vessels carry rocket apparatus rather than rely on rockets fired to the ship from shore, and also that a motor lifeboat be stationed at Whitby.

The Gold Medal of the Royal National Lifeboat Institution, the Institute's highest honour, was presented to Superintendent Major H. E. Burton and Coxswain Robert Smith of the Tynemouth lifeboat Henry Vernon and to Coxswain Thomas Langlands of the Whitby lifeboat. The Empire Gallantry Medal (subsequently changed to the George Cross) was awarded to Burton and Smith in 1924. In 1917 a monument was erected at Whitby by the British India Steam Navigation Company, commemorating all those who lost their lives in the tragedy.

See also
 List of United Kingdom disasters by death toll

References

Further reading
 Brittain, Colin (2014). Into the Maelstrom: The Wreck of HMHS Rohilla. The History Press. 
 HMS Rohilla photograph at Port Said(archived)

External links
Footage of the wreck and people being rescued from the sea (hosted on British Pathé)

World War I shipwrecks in the North Sea
Shipwrecks of England
Ships built in Belfast
Maritime incidents in October 1914
1914 disasters in the United Kingdom
Ships of the British India Steam Navigation Company
Hospital ships in World War I
Hospital ships of the Royal Navy
1906 ships
Ships built by Harland and Wolff
Rohilla